Bodiyabaduge Marshal Anslem Romanis Perera (1930/1931 – 30 May 2020) (PC) was a Sri Lankan politician and governor of Uva, Sabaragamuwa and Southern Provinces. He served as Governor of Sabaragamuwa Province, in office between January 2015 and April 2018. He served as Governor of the country's Southern Province from 12 April 2018 to 31 December 2018 and also served as Governor of Uva Province from 9 January 2019 to 3 August 2019.

Perera was called to the bar on 15 June 1955 and in July 2006, after fifty years in the legal profession, was appointed as a President's Counsel. He ran a legal practice in the High Court of Uva Province, the Badulla District Court, the Magistrate Courts and Labour Tribunal. Perera's son, Dilan, is the Member of Parliament for Badulla and a former Non-Cabinet Minister of Port Development.

Death 
He died on 30 May 2020 at the age of 89 while being treated at a private hospital in Colombo after falling ill. His funeral was held on 1 June 2020 in Badulla and President Gotabaya Rajapaksa paid his last respects and tribute.

References

2020 deaths
Governors of Sabaragamuwa Province
Governors of Southern Province, Sri Lanka
Governors of Uva Province
Sri Lankan politicians
Sinhalese politicians
Place of birth missing
Year of birth uncertain